The , previously known as the , designed to promote Western music in Japan, has been given by the Suntory Music Foundation since their establishment in 1969.  The award is presented annually to individuals or groups for the greatest achievement in the development of Western or contemporary music in Japan during the previous year.

The current prize is 7,000,000 yen (approximately US $70,000). A Suntory Music Award Commemorative Concert is held annually in Suntory Hall to introduce and popularize the work of the recipient.

Recipients

External links 
 Suntory Music Foundation – Suntory Music Award

Japanese music awards
Classical music in Japan
Awards established in 1969
Suntory